The Shocker is a series of electropneumatic paintball markers manufactured by Smart Parts. The original Shocker was built by PneuVentures and distributed by Smart Parts in the US in 1995.  It is now discontinued, but was the first electropneumatic paintball marker on the market at the time.  Several revisions of the marker have since been produced.

Shocker Sport (1995-2002) 

The first generation Shocker was one of the first mass-produced electropneumatic paintball markers on the market, effectively making it the "grandfather" of most markers used in tournament paintball today. Its closed bolt, hammerless design operated using two solenoids, rather than a hammer and spring, to open and close the valve and to cycle the bolt independently. Due to its large boxlike shape and significant weight, it was often referred to by the nicknames "shoebox" and "brick". The first generation Shocker was manufactured by a company called PneuVentures and sold through Smart Parts. This marker was discontinued in 1997, when Smart Parts redesigned it and began producing the marker in-house until 2002. This marker became known as the Shocker Sport. The Shocker Sport was large, heavy, had a limited firing speed of 11.2 balls per second, and poor air efficiency when compared to other markers from the same time period.

Shocker SFT (2003-2006) 

In 2003 Smart Parts released a completely new marker under the name Shocker SFT (Seal Forward Technology). The new Shocker was completely redesigned from the ground-up, and was essentially a new marker compared to the older Shocker Sport. Due to SP marketing it was given the name "Shocker" since the previous Shockers were discontinued. The Shocker SFT mainly features a single tube, open bolt spool valve design, capable of high firing speeds, and a small body design. It uses Shocker threaded barrels like its predecessor and operates with a pressure of  Shocker SFTs had an optional reflective anti-chop Vision eye which was an added accessory until 2006, when it became standard.

Private Label SFTs 

Some companies and teams produce their own customized versions of the Shocker:

Teams
 San Diego Dynasty
 Ton Ton
 Strange
 Tremor
 Nasty
Power trip

Companies
 Shocktech
 Hybrid
 Free Flow
 Warped Sportz
 Octane
 Dark
 Toxic
 Hyper Sports Works

Shocker NXT (2006-2009)

In late 2006, Smart Parts released the Shocker NXT, which is an improved version of the Shocker SFT. It has the same basic shape and operation as the Shocker SFT, same internals and solenoid, and similar electronics. However, it features a number of enhancements from the factory, which are designed to drive it to a higher performance and greater reliability. Of these include the following:
 Impulse/Ion threaded barrel (this became the "standard" Smart Parts barrel thread)
 New feedneck threading, incompatible with the previous models
 Break beam Vision eye system (standard)
 High Efficiency bolt (HE) standard ( All Shocker bolt's have the same thread pattern! So you may use different bolts on your Shocker.)
 Redesigned vertical ASA adapter, shifted the foregrip forward
 Redesigned vertical regulator
 Integrated bottomline dovetail rail
 Larger trigger guard space
 Redesigned dual plunger style ball detent
 Redesigned eye covers
 Redesigned frame and trigger setup ( You can use a NXT Shocker trigger on some SFT's depending on the year of the marker.)
 Constructed of 6061 grade aluminum, standard anodizing finish is "blasted" instead of gloss.

Private Label NXTs
Some companies and teams produce their own customized versions of the Shocker:

Teams
San Diego Dynasty
Naughty Dogs
Strange
Russian Legion
Tremor
Nasty
Ton Ton
OWL Sharks
DC Confidential

Companies
Shocktech  
Hybrid
Octane
Evil

External links

 Shocker Sport firing assembly animation
 Shocker SFT stock bolt animation
 Shocker HE bolt animation
 Smart Parts website
 Shocker Owners web forum
 How To Perform Maintenance On Your SFT/NXT Shocker

References

Paintball markers